The Bayer designations S Carinae and s Carinae are distinct. Due to technical limitations, both designations link here. For the star

 S Carinae or HD 88366
 s Carinae or HD 90853

Carinae, A
Carina (constellation)